Taidong is a station on Line 1 and Line 2 of the Qingdao Metro. It opened on 16 December 2019.

Gallery

References

Qingdao Metro stations
Railway stations in China opened in 2019